Magical creature, magical beast, or magical animal may refer to:

Religion, mythology, and folklore
Legendary creature, a mythological or folkloric creature
Anthropomorphic animal, a non-human animal attributed to human traits, emotions and intentions
Cryptid, a creature whose existence has been suggested but is unrecognized by scientific consensus and often regarded as highly unlikely
Monster, a type of grotesque creature, whose appearance frightens and whose powers of destruction threaten the human world's social or moral order
Mythological hybrid, a creature composed of parts from different animals
Human–animal hybrid, an entity that incorporates elements from both humans and animals
Talking animal, a non-human animal that can produce sounds or gestures resembling those of a human language
Therianthrope, a human being who metamorphoses into another animal by means of shapeshifting
Animals in religion
Animal deity, a deity represented in the form of an animal
Animal spirit, the spirit of an animal
Familiar spirit, a supernatural entity believed to assist witches and cunning folk in their practice of magic
Power animal, a broadly animistic and shamanic concept
Totem, a spirit being, sacred object, or symbol that serves as an emblem of a group of people
Vahana, a being, typically an animal or mythical entity, a particular Hindu deity is said to use as a vehicle 
Zoomorph, a being represented in the form of an animal

Fiction
A Book of Magical Beasts, a 1970 collection of fairy tales by Ruth Manning-Sanders
Book of Imaginary Beings, a 1957 book by Jorge Luis Borges with Margarita Guerrero
Magical creatures in Harry Potter
Talking animals in fiction

See also
Fantastic Beasts (disambiguation)